Sobradinho is a municipality in the state of Bahia, in Brazil. Once part of the municipality of Juazeiro it grew with the construction of the Sobradinho Dam and the flooding of the huge Sobradinho Reservoir. With the creation of the reservoir, the inhabitants of four cities and thirty villages had to leave their homes. In all 11,853 families (more than 70 thousand people) abandoned the old towns before the end of 1977. Of this total, 5,806 families remained in rural lots around the lake and 3,851 families moved to the new towns, including Sobradinho.

References

See also 
 List of power stations in Brazil

Municipalities in Bahia